State Route 7 (SR-7), also known as Southern Parkway, is a  east-west state highway in southern Washington County in the extreme southwestern portion of the US state of Utah. It connects the southern periphery of St. George with Hurricane, while providing access to the St. George Regional Airport.

Route description

State Route 7 starts at its intersection with I-15 in southwest St. George. From this point onwards, State Route 7 continues east for an additional , following the southern boundary of Sand Hollow State Park before gradually curving north and ending at an intersection with State Route 9 just west of downtown Hurricane.

The entire route is included in the National Highway System.

History
Since the 1977 Utah state route renumbering, no route in Utah had been designated as State Route 7, until 2009 when the Utah State Legislature added the Southern Parkway from Pioneer Road to River Road to the state highway system.

The first portion of the freeway opened July 7, 2009, a link between Exit 2 at I-15 south of Bloomington (a suburb within the city of St. George) to River Road in south St. George spanning . The second portion was completed in November 2010, extending further east to the new St. George Regional Airport. The third and final segment of State Route 7 between Sand Hollow Road and State Route 9 would finally open to traffic on May 20, 2021. The highway began as a mostly two-lane highway with at-grade intersections, envisioned to eventually be converted to a four-lane divided freeway.  The majority of these intersections have been updated to the planned interchanges.

Major intersections

See also

 List of state highways in Utah
 List of highways numbered 7

References

External links

 
 
 St. George project page

007
 007
State Route 007